Acacia kalgoorliensis is a shrub of the genus Acacia and the subgenus Plurinerves that is endemic to an area of south western Australia.

Description
Like most species of Acacia it has phyllodes rather than true leaves. The glabrous to sparsely hairy and thin leathery phyllodes have an inequilateral, narrow to linear-elliptic to oblanceolate shape and are straight to shallowly curved and have two or three main nerves that are sometimes evident.

Distribution
It has a scattered distribution along the south coast and island areas of Western Australia in the southern Wheatbelt, Great Southern and southern Goldfields-Esperance regions. The range of the species is from around Trayning and Chiddarcooping Hill in the north to the Fitzgerald River National Park in the south and as far east as Buningonia Spring and Sparkle Hill in the east with outlying specimens have been found as far east as Madura where it is found growing in loamy or sandy or clay soils that can be quite gravelly.

See also
List of Acacia species

References

verricula
Taxa named by Bruce Maslin
Taxa named by Richard Sumner Cowan
Acacias of Western Australia
Plants described in 1990
Endemic flora of Australia